Antonio Petković (born 11 January 1986) is a Croatian water polo player who won silver medals at the 2015 World Championships and the 2016 Olympics.

Orders
Order of Danica Hrvatska with face of Franjo Bučar - 2016

See also
 List of Olympic medalists in water polo (men)
 List of World Aquatics Championships medalists in water polo

References

External links
 

1986 births
Living people
Sportspeople from Šibenik
Croatian male water polo players
Water polo drivers
Water polo players at the 2016 Summer Olympics
Medalists at the 2016 Summer Olympics
Olympic silver medalists for Croatia in water polo
World Aquatics Championships medalists in water polo
Olympiacos Water Polo Club players
Croatian expatriate sportspeople in Greece
Expatriate water polo players
Croatian expatriate sportspeople in France
Croatian expatriate sportspeople in Italy